Saint Nicholas Centre may refer to:
 A section of the Aberdeen Bon Accord Centre
 A shopping centre located on Sutton High Street